T. S. Sathyavathi (born 30 June 1954) is an Indian musicologist, performer and scholar from Bengaluru, Karnataka.

Biography
Sathyavathi was born on 30 June 1954 in Bangalore, Karnataka to T. S. Srinivasa Murthy and Shrirangalakshmi. As a child, she sang before the Maharani of Mysore at the age of two.

Career
Sathyavathi started her Carnatic classical music training under her elder sister Vasantha Madhavi and received her expertise under R. K. Srikantan  in Carnatic classical vocal music. She first performed when she was 16 years old. With an interest in research-based study of music, she developed her skills under the guidance of Sangeetha Kalarathna B. V. K. Sastry in musicology and Sangeetha Kalarathna K Venkataraman in Mridangam. 

 Performer

Sathyavathi gave her first performance at the age of 16, in Karnataka Ganakala Parishat, Bengaluru. She has performed at major venues and sabha-s both in India and abroad. Her performances at SAARC Summit in 1985; Madras Music Academy, 
 Academic

Sathyavathi served as Professor in Sanskrit until 2014, at VVS first grade college for women, Basaveshwarnagar, Bangalore. She has been a major resource person and has delivered lectures at various prestigious platforms including multiple national and international conferences. As an active academician, she was an advisory at multiple education platforms.

Awards

  Karnataka Kalashree , Govt. of Karnataka
 Musicologist Award, Madras Music Academy, Chennai
 Asthana Vidushi Avani Shankar Mutt, Bangalore
 Jnanasamudra, Mudra, Chennai
 Natyaveda, Mallige Kannada Samgha, USA

References 

Living people
1954 births
20th-century Indian musicians
Writers from Karnataka
20th-century Indian educators
Indian women musicologists
Women musicians from Karnataka
Women educators from Karnataka
Women writers from Karnataka
Writers from Bangalore
20th-century women educators
20th-century Indian women